Khed railway station is a station on Konkan Railway. It is at a distance of  down from origin. The preceding station on the line is Diwankhavati railway station and the next station is Anjani railway station.

The station offers free Wi-Fi.

References

Railway stations along Konkan Railway line
Railway stations in Ratnagiri district
Railway stations opened in 1995
Ratnagiri railway division